1883 East Sydney colonial by-election may refer to 

 1883 East Sydney colonial by-election 1 held on 11 January 1883
 1883 East Sydney colonial by-election 2 held on 11 January 1883

See also
 List of New South Wales state by-elections